The Carteret County Regiment was authorized by the North Carolina Provincial Congress on September 9, 1775.  It was subordinate to the New Bern District Brigade after May 4, 1776.  The regiment was engaged in battles or skirmishes against the British during the American Revolution, including the Battle of Stono Ferry and the Battle of Beaufort.  The regiment also existed during the colonial period in the Province of North Carolina.

Leadership
The Carteret County Regiment was commanded by the following colonels:
 William Thompson (1775-1779)
 Thomas Chadwick (1778-1779)
 2nd Colonel Malachi Bell (1779-1783)
 2nd Colonel Enoch Ward (1780-1783)

Known Lieutenant Colonels:
 Lt. Col. Solomon Shepherd
 Lt. Col. John Easton
 Lt. Col. James Cole Mountflorence

Known Majors:
 1st Maj. Thomas Chadwick
 2nd Maj. Malachi Bell
 Maj. Isaiah Chadwick
 Maj. William Dennis
 Maj. Eli West
 Maj. Bryce Williams

See also
 Carteret County, North Carolina
 Southern Campaigns: Pension Transactions for a description of the transcription effort by Will Graves
 Southern theater of the American Revolutionary War
 List of North Carolina militia units in the American Revolution

References

North Carolina militia
1775 establishments in North Carolina